Rohese of Monmouth (Rohese de Monemue in Anglo-Norman; born about 1135/1140; died in or near 1180) was the daughter of Baderon fitzWilliam, lord of Monmouth, and of his wife Rohese de Clare. About the year 1155 Rohese married Hugh de Lacy, Lord of Meath. They had eight children
 Walter, born about 1172, who succeeded his father as Lord of Meath
 Hugh, born about 1176, who was created 1st Earl of Ulster
 Gilbert
 Robert, who died young
 William, who was captured in Ireland in 1210 by King John and died in captivity
 Elaine, who married Richard de Beaufo
 Alicia, who married Roger Pipard and afterwards Geoffrey de Mareys
 a daughter, who married William fitzAlan
Rohese is notable for the gift that she made, jointly with her husband and her son Robert, to Monmouth Priory. The Priory had benefited for more than half a century from her family's generosity, and it was clearly at her persuasion that this donation took place. Three shillings were to be given to the priory each year on St Michael's Day from the revenues of the town of Lydney in Gloucestershire. Rohese's brother Gilbert, otherwise known as a patron of literature, was among the witnesses to this donation.

Notes

External links 
 
 

Anglo-Normans in Wales
1180 deaths
People from Monmouth, Wales
Year of birth unknown